Cycas seemannii is a species of cycad found in Fiji, Vanuatu (in Efate), Tonga, and New Caledonia.

In Vanuatu, the cycad is known as namele and is an important symbol of traditional culture. It serves as a powerful taboo sign, and a pair of namele leaves appears on the national flag and coat of arms. Together with the nanggaria plant, another symbol of Vanuatu culture, the namele also gives its name to Nagriamel, an indigenous political movement.

References

seemannii
Taxa named by Alexander Braun